Hanna Chang (born February 25, 1998) is an American professional tennis player.

Chang has a career high WTA singles ranking of 214, achieved on 21 March 2022. She also has a career high WTA doubles ranking of 265, achieved on 6 June 2022.

Chang won her first major ITF title at the 2021 Koser Jewelers Tennis Challenge in the doubles draw partnering Alexa Glatch.

Grand Slam singles performance timeline

ITF Circuit finals

Singles: 7 (4 titles, 3 runner–ups)

Doubles: 5 (2 titles, 3 runner–ups)

References

External links
 
 

1998 births
Living people
American female tennis players
21st-century American women